Moore Island is an uninhabited island in the Qikiqtaaluk Region, Nunavut, Canada. It lies in Boat Passage, on the northern side of Rupert Bay, an extension of Hudson Bay. It measures about  along its longest axis.

References

External links 

Islands of James Bay
Uninhabited islands of Qikiqtaaluk Region